The 2017 Isle of Anglesey County Council election, to the Isle of Anglesey County Council was held on 4 May 2017 as part of the 2017 United Kingdom local elections. All 30 council seats were up for election. The previous full election took place in 2013 and the following one in 2022.

Overall results
Following the election Plaid Cymru gained two additional seats overall to become the largest party with 14 councillors. The Independents, ruling the council prior to the election, were reduced to 13 councillors. Previous Independent Group leader, Ieuan Williams, stood down from this position prior to the election. The Independent council leader prior to 2013, Bryan Owen, won a seat in the Bro Aberffraw ward, having previously lost his Canolbarth Môn seat in May 2013. He won by only 6 votes, though a recount was refused by the returning officer.

Later that month Plaid Cymru leader, Llinos Medi, was the only candidate to put herself forward as leader and Plaid Cymru consequently led the council with the help of support from some Independent members.

Results by ward

* = denotes councillor elected to this ward at the previous election

Isle of Anglesey Council results per ward also give the number of registered electors, number of ballot papers issued and turnout

Aethwy

Bro Aberffraw

Bro Rhosyr

Caergybi

References

2017
2017 Welsh local elections